Ding Yu (circa 1800), was a Chinese painter. She was married to the painter Zhang Pengnian (1761–1818) and known for her portrait paintings in Western style.

References 
 

19th-century deaths
19th-century Chinese painters
18th-century Chinese women artists
18th-century Chinese painters
19th-century Chinese women artists